This is a list of actors and voice actors who appeared in one or more installments of the Police Academy film and television series.

Film series

Animated series

Television series

Major characters in films and television series 

Police Academy
Police Academy
Cast